Steve Wilkinson may refer to:

 Steve Wilkinson (footballer) (born 1968), English footballer
 Steve Wilkinson (cricketer) (born 1949), English cricketer
 Steve Wilkinson (tennis) (1941–2015), American tennis player and tennis coach
 Steve Wilkinson, member of the music trio, The Wilkinsons